The Real Dream Girls is a 2006 Hindi B-grade romantic-drama film directed by Suresh Jain and produced under the banner of Om Siddhi Vinayak Creators. It features actors Gulshan Rana and Tanveer Hashmi in the lead roles. Shivam–Farhaan scored the music for the film. The film was re-released on 21 November 2014.

Cast 
 Gulshan Rana
 Tanveer Hashmi
 Karishma
 Dipti Verma
 Aktar Khan
 Alpana Upadhyay
 Ayaz Azmi
 Satyam Chohan

Music 
Shivam–Farhaan have given the soundtrack of the film. Lyrics have been penned by Anjan Sagri. A track titled "Hum Kaun Hai Tumhare" have been sung by Shreya Ghoshal and Shaan. The other playback singers include notable Bollywood artists Poornima and Madhushree.

References

External links 
 
 

2006 films
2000s Hindi-language films
Indian erotic drama films
2000s erotic drama films
Erotic romance films
2006 drama films